Khwahan may refer to:

 Khwahan District, a sub-division of Badakhshan Province in eastern Afghanistan
 Khwahan, a city and capital of the Khwahan District